Elmont is an unincorporated community in northern Shawnee County, Kansas, United States.

History
Elmont was incorporated in 1886. It was a shipping point on the Chicago, Rock Island and Pacific Railroad. A post office was opened in Elmont in 1887, and remained in operation until it was discontinued in 1955.

Education
Elmont currently has an Elementary School operated by USD 345 Seaman school district.

References

Further reading

External links
 Shawnee County maps: Current, Historic, KDOT

Unincorporated communities in Shawnee County, Kansas
Topeka metropolitan area, Kansas
Unincorporated communities in Kansas